Roy McLachlan (24 December 1901 – 17 April 1973) was an Australian politician who represented the South Australian House of Assembly seat of Victoria from 1947 to 1953 for the Liberal and Country League.

References

 

1901 births
1973 deaths
Members of the South Australian House of Assembly
Liberal and Country League politicians
20th-century Australian politicians